Henriette Löfman (23 August 1784 – 6 March 1836, Örby, Västergötland) was a Swedish composer.

She was married on 15 February 1822 to the nobleman general lieutenant Casimir Reuterskiöld (1770–1848).

She mainly composed works for harp.

Sources
 Nisser, Carl (1943). Svensk instrumentalkomposition 1770-1830. Stockholm: Gothia. Libris 1412043

1784 births
1836 deaths
19th-century classical composers
Swedish classical composers
Women classical composers
Swedish women composers
19th-century Swedish musicians
19th-century Swedish women musicians
19th-century women composers